Jimmy Connors was the defending champion and won the singles title at the 1983 Queen's Club Championships tennis tournament defeating compatriot John McEnroe in the final 6–3, 6–3.

Seeds

  Jimmy Connors (champion)
  John McEnroe (final)
  Ivan Lendl (semifinals)
  Vitas Gerulaitis (second round)
  Steve Denton (quarterfinals)
  Kevin Curren (semifinals)
  Bill Scanlon (third round)
  Brian Gottfried (quarterfinals)
  Hank Pfister (third round)
  Wojciech Fibak (third round)
  Brian Teacher (first round)
  Mark Edmondson (first round)
  Tim Mayotte (quarterfinals)
  John Alexander (first round)
  Paul McNamee (third round)
  Marcos Hocevar (third round)

Draw

Finals

Top half

Section 1

Section 2

Bottom half

Section 3

Section 4

References

External links
Official website Queen's Club Championships 
ATP tournament profile

Singles